The Hamburger Flugzeugbau Ha 135 was the first aircraft produced by the new aircraft subsidiary of the German company Blohm & Voss.

Development
The two-seat biplane manufactured by the Hamburger Flugzeugbau subsidiary of Blohm & Voss was a means of giving the company experience in making modern metal components for civil and military aircraft. It was developed as a trainer for the German Ministry of Aviation. After it proved unsuccessful in this role, the company sold it as a sport aircraft.

Operational history
The first prototype, designated the Ha 135 V1 (company production number 101, registration D-EXIL), made its first flight on 28 April 1934. After the company used it for flight development with a BMW-Bramo Sh 14A engine installed, the German Air Sports Association flew it as a sport aircraft.

The second prototype, designated the Ha 135 V2 (company production number 102, registration D-EKEN), made its first flight on 30 April 1934. The Hamburger Flugzeugbau used it for flight characteristics and performance tests beginning on 14 July 1934. It also later flew as a sport aircraft with the German Air Sports Association.

Hamburger Flugzeugbau manufactured four more Ha 135s before production ceased.

Specifications

References

Ha 135
1930s German military trainer aircraft
1930s German sport aircraft
Biplanes
Single-engined tractor aircraft
Aircraft first flown in 1934